Saint-Ybars is a commune in the Ariège department in southwestern France.

Population
Inhabitants of Saint-Ybars are called Eparchois.

Geography
The Lèze forms part of the commune's western border.

See also
Communes of the Ariège department

References

Communes of Ariège (department)
Ariège communes articles needing translation from French Wikipedia